Pontus Sjögren (born 13 April 1985) is a former Swedish professional ice hockey goaltender, who last played for Dundee Stars in the EIHL. His youth team is IFK Tumba.

References 
 

Living people
1985 births
Huddinge IK players
Södertälje SK players
Dundee Stars players
Swedish ice hockey goaltenders
Ice hockey people from Stockholm
Swedish expatriate ice hockey people
Swedish expatriate sportspeople in Scotland
Expatriate ice hockey players in Scotland